Cheshmeh Siah (also Romanized as Cheshmeh Sīāh) is a village in Haft Ashiyan Rural District, Kuzaran District, Kermanshah County, Kermanshah Province, Iran. At the 2006 census, its population was 41, in 13 families.

References 

Populated places in Kermanshah County